Mi Perú is a district of the Constitutional Province of Callao in Peru, and one of the seven districts that comprise the port city of Callao.

History 
Mi Perú was part of Ventanilla District until May 17, 2014, when it was created as District by Law N° 30197.

Geography
The district has a total land area of 2.47 km2. Its administrative center is located 34 meters above sea level.

Boundaries
East: Puente Piedra District 
North, west and south: Ventanilla District

Authorities 
The current mayor of the district is Reynaldo Encalada Tovar.

See also 
 Administrative divisions of Peru

References

External links
 Municipalidad Distrital de Mi Perú - City council official website (in Spanish)
 Todo Callao (in Spanish)
 INEI Peru (in Spanish)

Districts of the Callao Region
States and territories established in 2014
2014 establishments in South America